Chetin may refer to 
Chetin Kazak (born 1972), Bulgarian politician
Chetin Sadula (born 1987), Bulgarian football player
Gennady Chetin (1943–2002), Russian weightlifter 
Chetan, Iran, a village in Iran

See also 
 Chitin (disambiguation)